A list of the published work of Ekaterina Sedia, American biologist and speculative fiction writer.

Fiction

Novels
According to Crow (May 2005)
The Secret History of Moscow (November 2007)
The Alchemy of Stone (July 2008)
The House of Discarded Dreams (November 2010)
Heart of Iron (July 2011)

Short fiction
 "Alphabet Angels" (with David Bartell) in Analog Science Fiction and Fact (March 2005)
 "Smiling Vermin" (with David Bartell) in Analog Science Fiction and Fact (May 2005)
 "Kamikaze Bugs" (with David Bartell) in Analog Science Fiction and Fact (January/February 2006)
 "Daniel Dreams" in Fortean Bureau #29 (March 2005)
 "Spiders&Saints" in Bare Bone 7 (April 2005, Raw Dog Screaming Press)
 "Frederick Finds God" (flash) in Fusing Horizons (September 2004)
 "Making Ivy" in Poe's Progeny  (May 2005)
 "Just Chutney" in Aeon Magazine #3 (May 2005)
 "Every Eight and Eleven" in The Elastic Book of Numbers (February 2005, Elastic Press)
 "Animals That Belong to the Emperor" in Between Kisses (February 2005)
 "Memories of The Fog" in Potter's Field (May 2005, Sam's Dot Publishing)
 "Still Life in the Mirror" in Panic  (August 2005, Sam's Dot Publishing)
 "Tapestry in Black and White" in Dream the Dark Majestic (August 2005, Ragemachine)
 "Huni's Love of Clay" in Travel a Time Historic (September 2005, Ragemachine)
 "Walrus Skin" in The Walri Project (forthcoming)
 "Heart of the Scarab" in Lenox Avenue #6 (May/June 2005)
 "Yakov and the Crows" in Book of Dark Wisdom #10 (December 2006)
 "The Mermaid Collector" in Book of Dark Wisdom (forthcoming)
 "Hector Meets the King" in New Writings in the Fantastic (Fall 2007, Pendragon Press)
 "Torsion" in Nemonymous 7 (2007)
 "Kikimora" in Jabberwocky #1 (July 2005, Prime Books)
 "God's Chosen" in Oceans of the Mind #XVIII (2005)
 "Fistula" in Liquid Laughter Volume 1: Medicine Show (November 2006)
 "Hydraulic" in Spicy Slipstream Stories (forthcoming, Wheatland Press)
 "Sagekites' Land" in Strange Pleasures #6 anthology (forthcoming, Prime Books)
 "Manuel and the Magic Fox" in Fantasy Magazine #3 (2006, Prime Books)
 "A Thousand Cuts" in Other Than #1 (forthcoming)
 "Munashe and the Spirits" GrendelSong # 1 (September 2006)
 "Cherrystone and Shards of Ice" HP Lovecraft's Magazine of Horror (forthcoming)
 "A Play for a Boy and Sockpuppets" in The New Book of Masks (February 2007, Raw Dog Screaming Press)
 "Simargl and the Rowan Tree" in Mythic # 2 (September 2006)
 "The Clockmaker's Daughter" in Horrors Beyond II: Stories of Strange Creations  (December 2007, Elder Signs Press)
 "Redemption of Nepheli" in Jim Baen's Universe (April 2007)
 "Ebb and Flow" in Japanese Dreams a (2008, Prime Books)
 "Zombie Lenin" in Fantasy Sampler (Spring 2007, Prime Books)
 "Out of Her Element" in Magic in the Mirrorstone (2008, Mirrorstone Books)
 "Seas of the World" in Sybil's Garage #4 (May 2007)
 "Virus Changes Skin" in Analog Science Fiction and Fact (October 2007)
 "The Taste of Wheat" in Clarkesworld Magazine #11 (August 2007)
 "The Rats That Didn't Sing" in Cats With Wings #3 (January 2008)
 "The Disemboweler" in Lone Star Stories (February 2008)
 "By the Liter" in Subterranean Magazine (Spring 2008)
 "A Short Encyclopedia of Lunar Seas" in The Endicott Studio Journal of Mythic Arts (August 2008)
 "Two of Cups" in Behind the Wainscot # 15 (August 2008)
 "Herding Vegetable Sheep" in Clarkesworld Magazine #30 (March 2009)
 "Citizen Komarova Finds Love," in Exotic Gothic 3 (2009, Ash-Tree Press)
 "Helena" in Exotic Gothic 4 (2012, PS Publishing)
 "A handsome fellow", Asimov's Science Fiction, 36/10&11 (Oct/Nov 2012)

Poetry
 "The Sandman's Sestina" in Dream the Dark Majestic (August 2005, Ragemachine)
 "The Inquisitor's Villanelle" in Goblin Fruit #1 (April 2006)
 "Mermaid" in Goblin Fruit (Spring 2007)

Non-Fiction
 "Making Neologisms Work in Speculative Literature" in Reflection's Edge (February 2005)

Bibliographies by writer
Bibliographies of American writers